George Malcolm Emmett (2 December 1912 – 18 December 1976) was an English cricketer, who played first-class cricket for Gloucestershire County Cricket Club. He also played one Test match for England in 1948.

Life and career
George Malcolm Emmett was born in Agra, United Provinces of Agra and Oudh in British India in 1912. He started his cricket career in minor county cricket with Devon, before he moved to Gloucestershire to qualify to play for the county side by residency from 1936. He lost five years of his playing career as a result of World War II, but by 1947 Emmett was enjoying first-class success.

In 1948 he was picked to play for England, replacing Leonard Hutton at Old Trafford. Cricket writer, Colin Bateman, noted that it "caused something approaching national outrage". "It was not so much the choice of Emmett, a highly-rated attacking opening batsman, that caused the stir as the absence of the man he replaced". Emmett was caught for 10 in the first innings, and failed to score in the second. Hutton was restored to the side for the next encounter, and Emmett had no more international recognition.

Emmett stayed at Gloucestershire, playing with distinction, until 1959, and captained the county from 1955 to 1958. After retiring as a player he became coach at Gloucestershire.

George Emmett died in Knowle, Bristol, in December 1976, at the age of 64.

See also
One Test Wonder

References

External links
 

1912 births
1976 deaths
British people in colonial India
People from Agra
England Test cricketers
English cricketers
Devon cricketers
Gloucestershire cricketers
Gloucestershire cricket captains
Marylebone Cricket Club cricketers
North v South cricketers
Commonwealth XI cricketers
Players cricketers
West of England cricketers
St. Paul's School, Darjeeling alumni